A virtual observatory (VO) is a collection of interoperating data archives and software tools which utilize the internet to form a scientific research environment in which astronomical research programs can be conducted.

In much the same way as a real observatory consists of telescopes, each with a collection of unique astronomical instruments, the VO consists of a collection of data centres each with unique collections of astronomical data, software systems and processing capabilities.

The main goal is to allow transparent and distributed access to data available worldwide. This allows scientists to discover, access, analyze, and combine nature and lab data from heterogeneous data collections in a user-friendly manner.

The IVOA (International Virtual Observatory Alliance) is a standards body created by the VO projects to develop and agree the vital interoperability standards upon which the VO implementations are constructed.

Examples 
 AstroGrid: UK's Virtual Observatory Service
 ChiVO: the Chilean Virtual Observatory
 Euro-VO: the European VO (a partnership of VOs including AstroGrid, the French-VO, ESO, ESA...) 
 National Virtual Observatory: USA's VO
The eSTAR Project: a UK-funded virtual observatory project for autonomous ground-based followup to transient events.
 Virtual Observatory, India: India's Virtual Observatory
 Iran Virtual Observatory: Iran's Virtual Observatory
 Virtual Solar Terrestrial Observatory: Tetherless World Research Constellation at Rensselaer Polytechnic Institute in conjunction with the High Altitude Observatory of National Center for Atmospheric Research
 SPASE: Space Physics Archive Search and Extract
 TELEIOS: European Union-funded virtual observatory for Earth observation data. Powered by the CWI MonetDB scientific database, it provides access to TerraSAR-X archive of the DLR.

Reference List of VO sites 
 Argentinian Virtual Observatory
 Armenian Virtual Observatory
 Australian Virtual Observatory
 Brazilian Virtual Observatory
 Chilean Virtual Observatory
 European Virtual Observatory
 German Astrophysical Virtual Observatory
 Hungarian Virtual Observatory
 Iran Virtual Observatory
 Italian Virtual Observatory
 Japanese Virtual Observatory
 Korean Virtual Observatory
 Russian Virtual Observatory
 Spanish Virtual Observatory
 UK Virtual Observatory
 US Virtual Astronomical Observatory
 Virtual Observatory France
 Virtual Observatory, India
 Virtual Solar Terrestrial Observatory

See also 
 Planetarium software

References and sources

References

Sources
 
 Talk on NEMO and theory in a virtual observatory (Peter Teuben, Univ. of Maryland) 
 Virtual Observatories initiatives worldwide, State of the projects 2006 (InterQuanta)
 Documentation on VO tools (Terapix)